The SS Fort Cumberland was one of the nearly 500 Type T2-SE-A1 tankers ordered by the Maritime Commission during World War II.  She was named for the city of Cumberland, Maryland while her predecessors were named for the river. After the war she was sold to Standard Oil of New Jersey and sailed under the name Esso Cumberland.

In 1956 with the Suez crisis Esso Cumberland was acquired by the Navy and assigned to the Military Sealift Command as USNS Cumberland (T-AO-153).

In 1966, Cumberland was converted by Newport News Shipbuilding & Dry Dock Company to a floating electric power supply ship for use in South Vietnam by the United States Army. Stationed at Qui Nhon, South Vietnam her main machinery generated electricity which was transmitted, via power cables, ashore to sub-stations. Later she was moved to Cam Ranh Bay.

Cumberland was sold to Kaohsiung shipbreakers in February 1972.

References
 Navsource
 t2tanker.org
 

 

Type T2-SE-A1 tankers
Ships built in Pennsylvania
1944 ships
World War II tankers of the United States
Type T2-SE-A1 tankers of the United States Navy
Vietnam War auxiliary ships of the United States